Phostria ocellalis is a moth in the family Crambidae. It was described by Per Olof Christopher Aurivillius in 1925. It is found in the Democratic Republic of the Congo.

References

Phostria
Moths described in 1925
Moths of Africa